El primer nueva crónica y buen gobierno (English: The First New Chronicle and Good Government), is a Peruvian chronicle finished around 1615. Its author, the indigenous Peruvian Felipe Guamán Poma de Ayala, sent it as a handwritten manuscript to King Philip III of Spain. His purpose was to give a historical account of the Andes from the earliest human beings to the Incas and the Spanish conquest; it was also meant as a call of attention towards the deep problems caused by Spanish government in the region. The manuscript was never published and its location for the next several centuries was unknown. The scholar Richard Pietschmann rediscovered it at the Royal Danish Library in Copenhagen in 1908; Paul Rivet published a facsimile edition in Paris in 1936. Some researchers believe that the manuscript traveled from Spain to Denmark via the library of the Count-Duke of Olivares, in Spain, part of which was sold to Cornelius Pedersen Lerche, ambassador of Denmark in Spain. Nevertheless, this is only speculation.

Content 
The chronicle covers ancient Andean history, the rise of the Inca empire, the Spanish conquest in the 1530s, and early colonial society and government. Guamán Poma's discussion of Inca rule describes religion, social order, legislation, annual festivals and economic organization, as well as the functions of the different social groups. His narrative of Inca and pre-Inca times is often  inaccurate according to modern understandings, but reflects how the Incas were remembered in the early colonial period, as well as Guamán Poma's distinctive ideas. Approximately half the book is dedicated to a description and harsh critique of Spanish colonial rule; scholars consider this section of the book as a uniquely valuable and reliable historical source. The book contains a large number of detailed illustrations which are often reproduced in books and articles about pre-conquest and colonial Peru. Guamán Poma dedicated the book to King Philip III of Spain, in the hope of improving colonial rule, but there is no evidence that the king ever saw the book.

Reprint 
 Hackett Publishing, abridged edition, 2006,

Bibliography 
 Adorno, Rolena. Writing and Resistance in Colonial Peru, Texas University Press, 2000

External links 

 "Guamán Poma - El primer nueva corónica y buen gobierno" – A high-quality digital version of the Corónica, scanned from the original manuscript.

Peruvian literature
American chronicles
17th-century history books
Memory of the World Register
Indigenous topics of the Andes
Inca